Jabal, Jabel, Jebel or Jibal may refer to:

People
 Jabal (name), a male Arabic given name
 Jabal (Bible), mentioned in the Hebrew Bible

Places
In Arabic, jabal or jebel (spelling variants of the same word) means 'mountain'.

 Dzhebel, a town in Bulgaria
 Jabal Amman, part of Amman, Jordan
 Jabel, a German municipality
 Jabal, Amreli, a village in Gujarat, India
 Jabal Pur, city in Madhya Pradesh, India
 Jabal Rural District, in Iran
 Jebel, Timiș, a commune in Timiș County, Romania
 Jebel, Turkmenistan, a town
 Jibal or al-Jabal, a late 1st-millennium-CE West-Asian realm

Other uses
 Djebel (1937–1958), a racehorse

See also
 
 
 
 
 
 Jubal (disambiguation)